Quảng Sơn may refer to several places in Vietnam, including:

 Quảng Sơn, Quảng Bình, a rural commune of Ba Đồn.
 Quảng Sơn, Đắk Nông, a rural commune of Đăk Glong District.
 Quảng Sơn, Quảng Ninh, a rural commune of Hải Hà District.
 Quảng Sơn, Ninh Thuận, a rural commune of Ninh Sơn District.